The 1993 Soul Train Music Awards was held at the Shrine Auditorium in Los Angeles, California on March 9, 1993. The show was hosted by Natalie Cole, Patti LaBelle and Luther Vandross.

Special awards

Heritage Award
 Eddie Murphy

Humanitarian Award
 Michael Jackson

Sammy Davis Jr. Award for Entertainer of the Year
 En Vogue

Winners and nominees
Winners are in bold text.

Best R&B/Soul Album – Male
 Michael Jackson – Dangerous
 Bobby Brown – Bobby
 Tevin Campbell – T.E.V.I.N.
 Brian McKnight – Brian McKnight

Best R&B/Soul Album – Female
 Mary J. Blige – What's the 411
 Mariah Carey – MTV Unplugged
 CeCe Peniston – Finally
 Sade – Love Deluxe

Best R&B/Soul Album – Group, Band, or Duo
 En Vogue – Funky Divas
 Arrested Development – 3 Years, 5 Months and 2 Days in the Life Of...
 Prince and the New Power Generation – Love Symbol Album
 TLC – Ooooooohhh... On the TLC Tip

Best R&B/Soul Single – Male
 Michael Jackson – "Remember the Time"
 Chuckii Booker – "Games"
 Bobby Brown – "Humpin' Around"
 Sir Mix-a-lot – "Baby Got Back"

Best R&B/Soul Single – Female
 Whitney Houston – "I Will Always Love You"
 Mary J. Blige – "Real Love"
 Toni Braxton – "Love Shoulda Brought You Home"
 Vanessa Williams – "Save the Best For Last"

Best R&B/Soul Single – Group, Band, or Duo
 Boyz II Men – "Please Don't Go"
 Arrested Development – "Tennessee"
 En Vogue – "My Lovin' (You're Never Gonna Get It)"
 Jodeci – "Come and Talk to Me"

Song of the Year
 Boyz II Men – "End of the Road"
 Arrested Development – "Tennessee"
 En Vogue – "My Lovin' (You're Never Gonna Get It)"
 Vanessa Williams – "Save the Best For Last"

Best Music Video
 Boyz II Men – "End of the Road"
 Arrested Development – "People Everyday"
 En Vogue – "Giving Him Something He Can Feel"
 Michael Jackson – "Remember the Time"

Best New R&B/Soul Artist
 Mary J. Blige
 Arrested Development
 Kris Kross
 Shai

Best Gospel Album
 Shirley Caesar – He's Working It Out for You
 Milton Brunson and The Thompson Community Singers – My Mind is Made Up
 Commissioned – Number 7
 John P. Kee and the New Life Choir – We Walk By Faith

Best Rap Album
 Arrested Development – 3 Years, 5 Months and 2 Days in the Life Of...
 Das EFX – Dead Serious
 Father MC – Close to You
 Kris Kross – Totally Krossed Out

Best Jazz Album
 Najee – Just an Illusion
 Gerald Albright – Live at Birdland West
 George Duke – Snapshot
 George Howard – Do I Ever Cross Your Mind

Performers
 Arrested Development – "Mr. Wendal"
 Boyz II Men – Medley: "Please Don't Go" / "Motownphilly" / "Uhh Ahh" / "End of the Road"
 Commissioned – "Second Chance"
 En Vogue – Medley: "Best of My Love" / "I Heard It Through the Grapevine" / "Respect" / "Lady Marmalade" / "Tell Me Something Good"
 CeCe Peniston – "Keep On Walkin'
 Mary J. Blige – "Real Love"
 TLC 
 Michael Jackson – "Remember the Time"
 Chaka Khan – "And the Melody Still Lingers On (Night in Tunisia)"

Notable performances
 Michael Jackson, who sang "Remember the Time" during the ceremony, sat in a chair on the stage throughout the entire performance due to an injured ankle; dancers accompanied Jackson on choreography. Eddie Murphy, who was presented by Jackson with the Heritage Award, jokingly remarked "Isn't it nice to see him getting out and giving people awards.... I'd like to thank Michael for hobbling out here and giving me this award."

References

Soul Train Music Awards, 1993
Soul Train Music Awards
Soul
Soul
1993 in Los Angeles